The following television network and local stations operate on virtual channel 26 in Mexico:

Regional networks
TVMÁS in the state of Veracruz

Local stations
XHCGA-TDT in Aguascalientes, Aguascalientes

References

26 virtual